Tremithousa is a village in the Paphos District of Cyprus, located 7 km north of Paphos. Tremithousa is located 294 m above sea level. Tremithousa is located near Mesa Chorio and Mesogi Village. Tremithousa receives an average annual rainfall of about 520 millimeters; vines of winemaking varieties, vegetables, cereals, forage plants, citrus, almond, and walnut trees, and legumes are cultivated in the region.  The village has a reputation for the aromatic and tasty honey that it produces. Tremithousa connects in the north to the monastery of Agios Neofytos, in the northeast with the village of Tala, and in the east with the main road of Tsada – Polis.

Topography 
The small traditional village, located between mountain and sea at an altitude of 280 meters, offers panoramic views of the surrounding area. In this location, the visitor can enjoy the nature, the streams and springs that water the walnut trees, almonds, citrus fruits and vegetables produced here.

The village of Tremithousa, is located about 3 kilometers northwest of the city of Pafos. The village is built at an average altitude of 270 meters.  Its area has a general inclination from the northeast to the southwest and the altitude ranges from 150 to 500 meters. Tremithousa receives an average annual rainfall of about 520 millimeters; vines of winemaking varieties, vegetables, cereals, forage plants, citrus, almond, and walnut trees, and legumes are cultivated in the region.  The village has a reputation for the aromatic and tasty honey that it produces.

With respect to transportation Tremithousa connects in the north to the monastery of Agios Neofytos, in the northeast with the village of Tala, and in the east with the main road of Pafos – Polis.

Ethimology
Tremithousa took its name because of the “Tremithia”.  Tremithia (Terebinth: Pistacia terebinthus) is a tree that was found in large quantities in the surrounding area.  Thus the name Tremithousa implies an area that is filled with Terebinth trees.  Indeed, in the old times the village was known for its production of “Pafitiki Pissa” (gum of Pafos) (Cypriot Greek: Παφίτικη Πίσσα), which is made out of the resin of the Terebinth tree. Also in the old years with the traditional mills grind the fruit of the tremithia and produced the traditional oil, which was used by all the families. Several residents used it for therapeutic purposes.

Demographics 
The village, because of the small distance between it and the city of Pafos, has undergone great fluctuations of its population.  In 1881 the inhabitants of Tremithousa numbered 156, which increased to 196 in 1891, to 227 in 1901, and to 260 in 1911.  In 1921 the inhabitants numbered 298, 317 in 1931, 374 in 1946, and 418 in 1960.  In 1973 the inhabitants of Tremithousa were 424.  In 1976 the inhabitants decreased to 421 and in 1982 to 369.  In the 2001 census the inhabitants numbered 700. Today is 1300.

History 
The village existed during the Medieval years and -during the era of Frank domination, administratively it belonged to the village of Empa.  It probably is the village that was granted in 1375 -along with others -to Tibaldi Belfarang by King Peter II of Cyprus as a reward for the services he offered in the war against the Genoese.

Churches and Chapels

Church of Agios Reginos & Orestis 
The old church of the village that was dedicated to Riginos and Orestis, two foreign saints -which were however reported as having led an ascetic life in Cyprus and are celebrated together on the 20th of August -was located a bit outside of the village, to the east and near a river.  The church got destroyed and collapsed with the earthquake that occurred in 1953.  Indeed, there is a tradition reporting that, a bit further from this church, there was a bridge with a cave right beneath it, which had stalactites in its interior.  Water was springing from that spot.  During their tour of Cyprus for the purpose of preaching Christianity, the two saints hid in that cave and remained there for two-three days after being persecuted.  This place is considered as a holy one and many are the faithful that seek to be healed by washing their hands and face with the miraculous water of this cave, the two saints also being known as miracle makers with regards to having fever and shivering.  The cave is extant today although it is deserted.

In 1963 the new church of the Saints Riginos and Orestis started being built.  The church was completed and baptised in 1965 in a location at the centre of the village and a bit further from the church of St George.  Amidst the houses of the village, it is made of stone and has a semicircular roof that is covered with tiles.  The steeple is a simple structure adjacent to the rest of the building, it is not very tall, and it has two bells.  It can accommodate 100-150 Christians.  Internally, the icon screen is made as a mosaic (intarsia) and it is completed by the embedded holy icons.  The Psalters are wooden -an old making -as is the High Priest’s throne.  There is no women’s loft but the holy icon dedicated to the saints (18th century) is placed on a special, sealed kneeling desk to the left of the icon screen and towards the corner.  A liturgy takes place in it once or twice a month.  The day of the two saints is celebrated jointly on the 20th of August, their holy icon being carried about in procession.

Church of Agios Georgios 
The recently constructed church of St George is located at Southwest of the village Tremithousa.  It is now the main church of the village, since -until recently -the one that is dedicated to the Saints Riginos and Orestis functioned as the main church in Tremithousa.

The foundation stone was set in 2001 and the church was “baptised” on the 13th of June 2004.  Architecturally it is constructed in the Byzantine style with a dome.  It can accommodate around 500-600 faithful.  Externally it is painted and whitewashed.

Simplicity prevails in its interior.

Its ecclesiastical wealth makes itself present since the Holy See of Pafos, the Church Committee, and the community’s inhabitants made sure that everything was done to complete the church in all its splendour.  The icon screen, which cost quite a lot, is woodcut and made of walnut.  The Psalters are also made of walnut-wood and were donated by the sculptor and constructor.

The fabulous and convenient women’s loft, constructed in a semicircular fashion, allows the faithful of comfortably viewing and enjoying the services every Sunday and on holidays.

Externally, there are plans to enrich and complete the yard by paving it with slates.  The church celebrates on the 23rd of April, a day when the saint’s Holy icon is carried about in procession and many believers from the surrounding regions come to honour the day of Saint George.

References

Communities in Paphos District